Vessel(s) or The Vessel may refer to:

Biology
Blood vessel, a part of the circulatory system and function to transport blood throughout the body 
Lymphatic vessel, a thin walled, valved structure that carries lymph
Vessel element, a narrow water transporting tube in plant

Containers
Bowl (vessel), a common open-top container
Drinking vessel, for holding drinkable liquids
Pressure vessel, designed to hold fluids at a pressure different from the ambient pressure

Watercraft
Watercraft, also known as water vessel, craft designed for transportation on water
Sailing ship or sailing vessel, watercraft that uses sails and wind power for movement

Arts and entertainment

Film and television
Vessel (film), a 2014 documentary film by Diana Whitten
The Vessel (film), a 2016 film starring Martin Sheen
The Vessel (web series), a 2012 British comedy web series
"The Vessel" (The Outer Limits), a television episode

Music

Performers
Vessels (band), a British post-rock and electronic band
Vessel (solo artist), British electronic music producer and composer

Albums
Vessel (Dark Time Sunshine album), 2010
Vessel (Frankie Cosmos album), 2018
Vessel (Twenty One Pilots album), 2013
Vessel (DVD), a video album by Björk, 2003
Vessels (Be'lakor album), 2016
Vessels (Ivoryline album), 2010
Vessels (Starset album), 2017
Vessels (Wolf & Cub album), 2006

Songs
"Vessel", by Bodyjar from Role Model, 2013
"Vessel", by Nine Inch Nails from Year Zero, 2007
"Vessel", by Spratleys Japs from Pony, 1999

Other media
Vessel (comics), a fictional Marvel Comics villain
Vessel (video game), a 2012 video game developed by Strange Loop Games
Vessels - characters in the game Hollow Knight

Other uses
Vessel (structure), a public structure in New York City's Hudson Yards
Vessel (website), a subscription video service launched by the early team behind Hulu, including Hulu's former CEO Jason Kilar

People with the surname
Edy Vessel (born 1940), Italian actress and businesswoman